Başak Köklükaya (born 19 April 1974) is a Turkish actress. She has appeared in more than 20 films and television shows since 1989. She starred in The Confession, which was screened in the Un Certain Regard section at the 2002 Cannes Film Festival.

Since 2019 she has played a leading role in all three seasons of the Netflix original fantasy television series The Gift, as Serap Özgürsoy, mother of the main character Atiye.

Selected filmography

Film 
 Hamam (1996)
 Harem Suare (1999)
 The Third Page (1999)
 The Confession (2002)
 A Touch of Spice (2003)
 Magic Carpet Ride (2005)
 Milk (2008)
 Something Useful (2017)

References

External links
 

1974 births
Living people
Turkish film actresses
People from Ankara
Best Actress Golden Orange Award winners